Charles (McMillan) Rappleye (January 22, 1956 – September 15, 2018) was an American writer and editor. He is the co-founder, along with his wife Tulsa Kinney, of the art magazine Artillery. His work appeared in Virginia Quarterly Review, American Journalism Review, Columbia Journalism Review, LA Weekly, LA CityBeat, and OC Weekly.

Awards
 2006 best book by the New York City American Revolutionary War Round Table.
 2007 George Washington Book Prize.

Works
 Charles Rappleye, Herbert Hoover In The White House. New-York, NY: Simon & Schuster, 2016. .
Rappleye, Charles. Robert Morris: Financier of the American Revolution. New York: Simon & Schuster, 2010. .

References

External links
"Review by Erik J. Chaput: Sibling Rivalry in Early America", Common-place Review

2018 deaths
1956 births
American male writers